The 2006 If Stockholm Open was an ATP men's tennis tournament played on hard courts and held at the Kungliga tennishallen in Stockholm, Sweden. It was the 38th edition of the event and part of the ATP International Series of the 2006 ATP Tour. The tournament was held from 9 October through 15 October 2006. Second-seeded James Blake won his second consecutive singles title at the event.

Finals

Singles

 James Blake defeated  Jarkko Nieminen, 6–4, 6–2
 It was Blake's 5th singles title of the year and the 8th of his career.

Doubles

 Paul Hanley /  Kevin Ullyett defeated  Olivier Rochus /  Kristof Vliegen, 7–6(7–2), 6–4

References

External links
 Official website 
 ATP tournament profile

 
Stockholm Open
Stockholm Open
October 2006 sports events in Europe
2000s in Stockholm
Open